Nicholas or Nick Martin, or Martyn may refer to:

Nicholas Martyn (1593–1653), MP
Nick Martin (musician) (born 1982), American musician
Nicholas G. Martin (born 1950), behavior geneticist
Nick Martin (educator), American technologist, entrepreneur and educator
Nick Martin (American football) (born 1993), American football player
Nic Martin (born 2001), Australian rules footballer 
Miklós Martin (1931–2019), Hungarian water polo player, known as Nick
Nick R. Martin, American journalist
Nicholas Martin (director) of The Cherry Orchard
Nicholas Martin (screenwriter) of Florence Foster Jenkins (film)
Nicholas Martin (baseball), see 2010–11 Australian Baseball League regular season
Nicholas Martin (sailor), see 2011 ISAF Sailing World Championships – Men's 470
Nicholas Martin (rugby union), see World XV
Nic Martin (known professionally as UNO Stereo), Australian record producer